The 2018 Nigeria Women Premier League began on April 7 in a game featuring defending champions Nasarawa Amazons from Nasarawa State and FC Robo of Lagos State. The date was decided following a congress held in Ikeja on March 3. Prior to the game, a maiden super cup named the NWFL Champions Shield match was played between Aiteo Cup winners, Rivers Angels and Nasarawa Amazons to officially open the new season. At the end of the 2017 season, Sure Babes of Ilorin, Jokodolu Babes of Ogbomosho and Taraba Queens of Taraba State were promoted to compete in the elite division pending registration procedures, while Saadatu Amazons of Minna and Heartland Queens of Owerri were relegated to the pro league. In May 2018, the league went on a mid-season break due to the 2018 FIFA World Cup, this was further elongated after an emerging NFF leadership crisis. In August 2018, it was announced that the remaining games of the league will commence September 12.

Format 
The teams are divided into two groups of eight teams, of which the top two teams from each group will play in a super 4 mini-tournament tagged the NWPL Super 4 at the end of the season to determine the overall winner of the league. Each team is to play every team in her group twice on a home and away basis. The last placed teams in each group will be relegated to the pro league (division 2).

Teams 

Note

Memorable moments 
In a week 8 fixture, FC Robo defeated Abia Angels with Nigerian international, Rasheedat Ajibade scoring 4 goals in the game.

Nigeria Women Pro League - Division 2 
The division two teams seeking to gain promotion ahead of the 2019 Nigeria Women Premier League were Moje Queens of Kwara State, Police Machine of Akwa Ibom, Saadatu Amazons of Minna, Gift of Life, Invincible Angels of Gboko, Dream Stars of Lagos and Faith Hill Queens. In November 2018, it was confirmed that Dream Stars and Invincible Angels will be promoted to the elite division.

Top scorers

References 

Nigeria Women Premier League seasons
N
Wom
N
Wom